Nicholas Hamilton may refer to:

 Nicholas Hamilton, Australian actor and musician
 Nicholas Hamilton (footballer), Jamaican football player

See also
 Nick Barton (Nicholas Hamilton Barton), British evolutionary biologist
 Nicolas Hamilton, English racing driver